Miss Bala (English: "Miss Bullet") is a 2019 action thriller film directed by Catherine Hardwicke and written by Gareth Dunnet-Alcocer, based on the 2011 Mexican film of the same name. The film stars Gina Rodriguez, Ismael Cruz Córdova, and Anthony Mackie, and follows a woman who trains to take down a Mexican drug cartel after her friend is kidnapped.

The film was released in the United States on February 1, 2019, by Columbia Pictures, in Dolby Cinema. The film was a box office flop, grossing $15.4 million worldwide against a $15 million production budget. While Rodriguez's performance received some praise, critics compared the film unfavorably to the original, saying it suffered from "bland action and predictable story beats".

Plot 
Gloria Fuentes is a Latin-American makeup artist from Los Angeles who goes on a trip to visit her best friend Suzu in Tijuana, Mexico.

When the pair go to a local nightclub, Suzu plans to impress the local police chief, Saucedo, in order to help her chances of being in the upcoming Miss Baja California beauty pageant. When Gloria goes to the bathroom, armed gunmen break in through the vents and attempt to kidnap Gloria out of her stall, but she manages to escape while they shoot up the club. Chaos ensues as Gloria is separated from Suzu. The next morning, Gloria is unable to get in contact with Suzu and decides to ride with a police officer to try to find her friend. She informs the officer that she has information on the men who attacked the club, and the officer agrees to take her to the station for questioning. Instead, he drives to a remote area and leaves the car, whereupon Gloria is taken by members of Los Estrellas, the cartel behind the attack.

The kidnappers take her to their headquarters, where Lino, head of Los Estrellas, agrees to help her find Suzu if she agrees to work for them, as her American citizenship makes her useful. Gloria is reluctant but eventually agrees. Her first job is to get into a car and park it at the corner of a building. Gloria does so, and when she leaves the car and joins Lino's men at the top of a hill, they detonate a bomb attached to the car and incinerate the building. Gloria later discovers that the building was actually a Drug Enforcement Administration (DEA) safehouse containing three agents who had been tasked with monitoring the cartel's operations.

Lino then has Gloria registered as a contestant in the Miss Baja pageant; during rehearsal, she attempts to escape through the bathroom, only to be intercepted and arrested by a senior DEA agent, Brian Reich, who suspects her involvement in the bombing. He releases her from custody, but only after she agrees to become an informant. Brian puts a tracking chip in her cellphone and sends her back to Los Estrellas.

Gloria returns to Suzu's apartment and finds Lino there. He gives her another job: driving to San Diego with money and drugs hidden in her car. Upon crossing the border, Gloria is given an arsenal of guns to bring back to Mexico by Jimmy, an arms dealer, which she is instructed to deliver to a large parking lot. Gloria informs Brian about the meet-up at the parking lot, and he promises to get her to safety. As Gloria makes the hand-off, local police show up under Brian's command and a firefight breaks out. Gloria runs to a nearby gate expecting Brian to rescue her, but soon realizes that he lied and had no intention of helping her. Seeing Gloria stranded in the middle of the gunfight, Lino runs to her side only to get shot in the leg. After a moment of hesitation, Gloria helps Lino up and escapes with him in his car while his men hold off the police. Brian is killed in the gunfight.

The gang retreat to a fortified compound, where Gloria meets a woman named Isabella. Isabella explains that she was also threatened into joining Los Estrellas, and bears a special tattoo that marks her as their property. When Gloria hears that Lino has ordered an inspection of everyone's phones to find a mole in the group, she puts her tracking chip in another phone. Lino brings Gloria on a ride to meet some of his relatives, and they spend time together as Lino shares his dream of living a simple life in the countryside. He also trains Gloria in combat tactics and how to handle guns. As they return to the compound, the gang informs Lino that they have found the mole. To her horror, Gloria discovers that she had put the chip in Isabella's phone. Lino executes her on the spot, and the next day, Gloria angrily lashes out at him.

Despite their argument, Lino asks Gloria to help him assassinate Saucedo, who has become a threat to his business; to motivate her, he shows her a video of Suzu being auctioned off to various buyers, which reveals that she was forced into prostitution after being abducted at the nightclub. Gloria agrees to participate in the pageant and wins (after Lino bribes the judges), earning her an invitation to an afterparty at Saucedo's beach home. At the party, she agrees to spend the night with Saucedo, making sure Lino knows where to find him. She also runs into Suzu, and discovers that she has a tattoo on her hand, identical to Isabella's. Gloria finally puts the pieces together: Lino was the one who sold Suzu into prostitution.

As Gloria follows Saucedo into his bedroom, she writes on a postcard that Lino is going to kill him. Saucedo forces her at gunpoint to hide and escapes, just as Los Estrellas begins their attack. Gloria steals an assault rifle from a wounded soldier and goes to find Suzu. She shoots Saucedo in the leg when she sees him holding Suzu as a human shield, but then Lino kills him and thanks Gloria for her help. Gloria points her gun at Lino, confessing that she knows he's been manipulating her. Lino tries to bargain with Gloria, but she kills him.

The two women are soon arrested when the police arrive at the party. Gloria is taken to an interrogation room; to her shock, her interrogator is Jimmy, who explains that he is actually an undercover Central Intelligence Agency (CIA) operative working to dismantle Los Estrellas and other Mexican cartels involved in international organized crime. Gloria makes a deal with him to get Suzu and clear all of her charges: she will work as a CIA asset to infiltrate the cartels. She drives Suzu back to her family, and then departs with Jimmy.

Cast 
 Gina Rodriguez as Gloria Fuentes, a makeup artist from Los Angeles.
 Ismael Cruz Córdova as Lino Esparza, the chief of Las Estrellas, a gang from Tijuana.
 Matt Lauria as Brian Reich, a DEA officer.
 Ricardo Abarca as Pollo, Lino's main henchman.
 Cristina Rodlo as Suzu Ramós, Gloria's best friend who lives in Tijuana and a competitor on the Miss Baja California pageant.
 Sebastián Cano as Chava Ramós, Suzu's little brother who lives with her.
 Damián Alcázar as Rafael Saucedo, Tijuana chief of police.
 Anthony Mackie as Jimmy, a gangster from San Diego, who is secretly a CIA agent.
 Aislinn Derbez as Isabel, a woman abducted by Las Estrellas.
 Lilian Guadalupe Tapia Robles as Doña Rosita, a woman who work for Las Estrellas.
 Erick Rene Delgadillo Urbina as Tucán, Lino's henchman.
 Mikhail Plata as Chivo, Lino's henchman.
 Jorge Humberto Millan Mardueño as Ortiz, Lino's henchman.
 Thomas Dekker as Justin, Gloria's boss in Los Angeles.
 José Sefami as Don Ramon, a man who work for Rafael Saucedo.
 Gaby Orihuela as the coordinator of the Miss Baja California pageant.
 Roberto Sosa as the police officer who secretly work for Las Estrellas.

Production
In April 2017, it was announced Catherine Hardwicke would direct the film, from a screenplay by Gareth Dunnet-Alcocer, with Kevin Misher and Pablo Cruz producing the film, with Andy Berman serving as an executive producer on the film. In May 2017, Gina Rodriguez and Ismael Cruz Córdova joined the cast of the film. In July 2017, Matt Lauria, Cristina Rodlo, and Aislinn Derbez joined the cast of the film. Anthony Mackie later joined the cast of the film. The cast and crew are said to be 95 percent Latino. Sony reportedly spent $15 million producing the film.

Release
The film was released in the United States on February 1, 2019, after having previously been set for a January 25, 2019 release. It was in the United Kingdom on February 8, 2019.

Reception

Box office
Miss Bala has grossed $15 million in the United States and Canada, and $173,237 in other territories, for a worldwide gross of $15.2 million, against a production budget of $15 million.

In the United States and Canada, Miss Bala was projected to gross $6–9 million from 2,203 theaters in its opening weekend. It made $2.8 million on its first day, including $650,000 from Thursday night previews. It went on to debut to $6.7 million, finishing third at the box office. Deadline Hollywood wrote that given its $15 million production budget, an opening of $10–12 million would've been an ideal start in order for the film to turn a profit. It fell 60% in its second weekend to $2.7 million, finishing 10th.

Critical response
The website's critical consensus reads, "Miss Bala suggests Gina Rodriguez has a future as an action hero; unfortunately, it also demonstrates how hard it is to balance set pieces against a compelling story." On Metacritic, the film has a weighted average score of 41 out of 100, based on 30 critics, indicating "mixed or average reviews". Audiences polled by CinemaScore gave the film an average grade of "B" on an A+ to F scale, while those at PostTrak gave it an average 3.5 out of 5 stars; social media monitor RelishMix noted online responses to the film were "mixed-to-negative".

Richard Roeper, writing for the Chicago Sun-Times was critical of the film, saying, "Run away from Gina Rodriguez's ludicrous drug running shoot-em-up... Miss Bala is an early contender for a spot on my list of the worst movies of 2019."

References

External links
 
 

American action thriller films
American crime drama films
Mexican action thriller films
Mexican crime drama films
American remakes of Mexican films
Columbia Pictures films
Films directed by Catherine Hardwicke
Films about the illegal drug trade
Films about Mexican drug cartels
Films about beauty pageants
Films scored by Alex Heffes
Films set in Los Angeles
Films set in Tijuana
Films shot in Los Angeles
Films shot in Mexico
2010s Spanish-language films
2010s English-language films
2010s American films
2010s Mexican films